The Hyderabad–Lingampalli route (HL) is a rapid transit service of the Multi-Modal Transport System of Hyderabad, India. Spanning 13 stations, it runs between Hyderabad and  24 times a day.

Stations

External links
MMTS Timings as per South Central Railway
 Latest MMTS Train Timings

Rail transport in Telangana
Hyderabad MMTS